The following lists events that happened during 1876 in Australia.

Incumbents

Governors
Governors of the Australian colonies:
Governor of New South Wales – Hercules Robinson, 1st Baron Rosmead
Governor of Queensland – Sir William Cairns
Governor of South Australia – Sir Anthony Musgrave
Governor of Tasmania – Frederick Weld
Governor of Victoria – Sir George Bowen
Governor of Western Australia – Sir William Robinson GCMG.

Premiers
Premiers of the Australian colonies:
Premier of New South Wales – John Robertson
Premier of Queensland – Arthur Macalister until 5 June, then George Thorn
Premier of South Australia – James Boucaut until 6 June, then John Colton
Premier of Tasmania – Alfred Kennerley until 20 July, then Thomas Reibey
Premier of Victoria – James McCulloch

Events
20 February – Submarine cable between New South Wales and New Zealand completed.
21 March – J.V. Mulligan finds gold deposits in the Hodgkinson River in Queensland.
28 March – Classes commence at the University of Adelaide.
18 March – Luigi d'Albertis leaves Australia to explore New Guinea.
18–19 April – Catalpa rescue; Rescue team sent from New Bedford, Massachusetts, USA by John Devoy, rescues six escaped Fenian prisoners from Fremantle, Western Australia
5 June – George Thorn becomes Premier of Queensland.
6 June – John Colton becomes Premier of South Australia.
5 July – The completion of a railway bridge across the Brisbane River links Brisbane and Ipswich, Queensland.
20 July – Thomas Reibey becomes Premier of Tasmania
11 September – SS Dandenong sinks; 40 lives are lost.
7 November – The Melbourne Cup is run for the first time on the first Tuesday of November
27 November – Legislation is enacted in Queensland creating the first public fire service in Australia.
1 December – SS Georgette runs aground near Busselton, Western Australia; Grace Bussell and Sam Isaacs help to rescue the passengers.

Arts and literature

Births
7 September – C. J. Dennis
10 September – Hugh D. McIntosh
18 September – James Scullin
23 September – Cyril Brudenell White
24 September – Arthur Hennessy
4 October – Hugh McCrae
24 November – Walter Burley Griffin
21 December – J. T. Lang

Unknown date 

 Ambrose Dyson, also known as Amb Dyson, illustrator and political cartoonist (died 1913)

Deaths
22 January – George Dalrymple
8 March – Truganini
5 April – William Spain, first New South Wales Inspector-General of Police
24 May – Henry Kingsley
10 June – Kenneth Brown, an explorer and pastoralist in Western Australia. He was hanged in 1876 for murdering his second wife Mary Ann Brown.
29 August – John Skinner Prout

References

 
Australia
Years of the 19th century in Australia